Cináedh mac Coscrach, Abbot of Aghaboe and bard, died 874.

The Annals of the Four Masters contain a verse commemorating him.

 Great grief is Cinaedh the revered chieftain,
 son of Cosgrach of beaming countenance,
 The gifted torch, enraptured Bard,
 the exalted Abbot of Achadh Bo.

External links
 http://www.ucc.ie/celt/published/T100005A/

9th-century Irish writers
People from County Laois
9th-century Irish abbots
9th-century Irish poets
Irish male poets